Shadow Play (foaled 5 June 2005 in Pennsylvania) is a world-record-holding standardbred racehorse.  He was sired by The Panderosa, out of Matts Filly, a Matts Scooter mare.  The colt was purchased as a yearling for $16,000, and is owned by Dr Ian Moore of Charlottetown, PEI, R G McGroup LTD of Bathurst, NB, and Hockey Hall of Fame inductee Serge Savard of Saint-Bruno, Quebec.

2 Year Old Campaign
Shadow Play made his racing debut on 21 June 2007 in Charlottetown, PEI. With owner/trainer Dr Ian Moore at the controls, he beat a field of maiden pacers by 4-1/2 lengths.

Shortly thereafter, Dr Moore shipped the colt to Ontario, where he raced for the remainder of his 2-year-old year. He finished 2nd in 2 legs of the Dream Maker Pacing Series, followed by a 4th in the final.

The highlight of his year was a 3rd-place finish in an elimination of The Metro Pace at Mohawk. Assigned an outside post, Shadow Play never really got into the race despite pacing his own mile in 1:51-3/5.

He completed his freshman campaign with a mark of 1:57.2 (taken at Mohawk Racetrack) while compiling 3 wins, 3 seconds, and 3 thirds in 13 starts and earning $31,151.

3 Year Old Campaign
On 12 April 2008, Shadow Play surfaced for his second year with a 1:58 qualifier in Charlottetown, where he was 14 lengths the best. He returned to the track one week later to make his parimutuel debut, where he won by 13 lengths in 1:56.

Shadow Play's next start came in the Diplomat Pacing Series at Woodbine Racetrack in Toronto, where he returned a winner in a new career best 1:52-1/5. After winning both his starts in the initial legs of the Diplomat, he was sent away as favourite in the final but finished a fading 4th.

On 1 July 2008, Shadow Play made his racing debut for high-profile trainer Mark Ford. Leaving from the outside at Pocono Downs, a 5/8-mile track in Wilkes-Barre, PA, he finished third after being parked every step. The winner, Upfront Hannahsboy, set a new track record for 3-year-old colt & gelding pacers by virtue of his 1:49-2/5 victory.

Shadow Play then reeled off two victories at Pocono Downs, winning in 1:50-1/5 and 1:49-4/5, before breaking stride in a Pennsylvania Sires Stake event at The Meadows Racetrack and Casino near Pittsburgh, PA.

On 1 August 2008, he won an elimination of the Coors Delvin Miller Adios. With leading Grand Circuit driver David Miller in control, Shadow Play eased off the gate before making his move. Clearing just before the half, he opened up by 2 lengths on the field and maintained that advantage as he powered home in a world record for 3-year-old colt & gelding pacers on a 5/8-mile track, 1:48-2/5. This mile was 2/5-seconds from the all-aged world record and tied the 2nd-fastest mile on a 5/8th-mile track ever. He returned 8 days later to capture the $350,000 final of the Adios with a time of 1:50-4/5.

On 9 September 2008, it was announced that Shadow Play was named Horse of the Year at Pocono Downs.

On 18 September 2008, he again stepped into the record books. In his first heat of the Little Brown Jug, Shadow Play tied Mr Feelgood's stakes record of 1:50 scoring over Badlands Nitro. Though that record was broken in the next race by Lonestar Legend, Shadow Play returned to capture the Little Brown Jug, winning the second heat in a time of 1:50.1, setting a new two-heat world record for 3-year-old pacing colts.

10 October 2008 marked another milestone for Shadow Play as he returned a first-up winner over Badlands Nitro in the $275,000 Windy City Pace at Maywood Park. The time of 1:50.4 set a stakes record, lowering the 1:51.3 mark set in the 2007 edition by Booze Cruzin.

4 Year Old Campaign
After a promising start to his 4-year-old campaign, Shadow Play experienced trouble that put his season in question. It started with sickness in his Molson Pace elimination and was followed by a foot separation in each foot - just over a month apart. One week removed from his latest separation, Shadow Play returned a 14-1 winner in a new best 1:47.4 while holding off Mister Big in the US Pacing Championship at The Meadowlands on 8 August 2009.

Races

External links
 Shadow Play Shocks at 14-1
 Moore Comments on Shadow Play's Feet
 Moore Updates on Shadow Play
 Shadow Play Qualifies at Mohawk
 Shadow Play Wins Windy City Pace
 Shadow Play Headlines Windy City Pace
 Moore: Shadow Play Sound, Raring to Go
 Dr. Moore Gives Shadow Play Update
 Shadow Play Wins 63rd Little Brown Jug
 Moore High on Shadow Play's Jug Chances
 Field Set for Little Brown Jug
 Confederation Cup Elims Complete, Final Set
 Shadow Play to be Honored at Pocono
 Shadow Play Favoured in Delvin Miller Adios
 World Record for Shadow Play in Adios

Harness racing in Canada
American Standardbred racehorses
Racehorses bred in Pennsylvania
Racehorses trained in Canada
Horse racing track record setters
Little Brown Jug winners
2005 racehorse births